Ray Joseph Lugo (born November 15, 1967) is an American musician. Singing in English and Spanish, Lugo is internationally known for his prolific output and diverse solo work, as well as for leading the groups Kokolo Afrobeat Orchestra, Ray Lugo & The Boogaloo Destroyers and other projects.

Early life 

Lugo was born in Caracas, Venezuela. His father, Olmedo Lugo, is a Venezuelan lawyer, journalist, and author of Spanish descent. His mother, Lumen Palma, a former secretary, is of Spanish, Italian and Native American descent. As an unwed mother, Lugo's mother, ostracized by her family and facing discrimination from conservative society, left for the United States shortly after his birth. Lugo credits his mother's lifelong love of Classical music for inspiring his interest in the arts. As a child, he was a big fan of Chopin's "Nocturnes".

Career

Early years 
Lugo grew up on New York City's Lower East Side, a few blocks from CBGB's, immersed in between the harsh environment that was the city's reality throughout the 1970s and the variety of the art and music scenes centered around downtown Manhattan.

In his early teens, Lugo was a B-boy, immersed in the Big Apple's nascent hip-hop, graffiti and breakdancing cultures. The rise of punk rock  and the intermingling taking place in underground New York City clubs like Danceteria, The Roxy NYC and Save the Robots in the early 1980s drew Lugo towards the emerging hardcore scene largely based around CBGB's through his association with a number of pioneering bands in the genre, such as Warzone, whom he managed as a teen, Agnostic Front, Bad Brains, Leeway, Youth of Today, Gorilla Biscuits and others. While in college at New York University, Lugo befriended guitarist Blake Schwarzenbach and drummer Adam Pfahler, who invited Lugo to serve as first vocalist for the earliest incarnation of emo legends Jawbreaker. One of their band's first performances was as opening act for a play written and performed by Adam's sister, Kembra Pfahler of The Voluptuous Horror of Karen Black and her then husband and guitarist, Samoa Moriki.

In the early to mid-1990s, Lugo ran a small independent label out of a recording studio on Ludlow Street where he drew inspiration from the eclectic variety of groups and musicians associated with the studio, such as Chocolate Genius, Sim Cain, Marc Ribot Cibo Matto, and an early incarnation of Sharon Jones & The Dap Kings. Lugo also produced the first recordings and served as live-show hype man for Latin-ska band King Chango during that band's initial stages, with the relationship souring after a legal dispute over control of those initial recordings following the band's signing to David Byrne's Luaka Bop Label. During his time working with King Chango, Lugo befriended producer Bosco Mann and Saxophonist Martin Perna as college students and invited them to play in the band, prior to them forming influential groups like The Daktaris and Antibalas as well as Daptone Records, largely reviving global interest in funk, soul and Afrobeat.

Kokolo 
In 2001, Lugo formed Kokolo, after becoming interested in the Afrobeat music of Nigeria's Fela Kuti. Kokolo became part of the new wave of Afrobeat groups that emerged in New York in the early 2000s and would go on to play concerts globally and collaborate with artists such as Fela Kuti & Egypt 80/King Sunny Ade drummer Jojo Kuo, Jazz guitarist Charlie Hunter, Antibalas, Faze Action and many others. The band has released five studio albums: 2002's Fuss and Fight, 2004's More Consideration, 2007's Love International, 2009's Heavy Hustling and 2016's 100 Fevers. The group has been featured in international compilations, alongside artists like Femi Kuti, Ska Cubano, Tony Allen, U-Roy, Caetano Veloso, Masters at Work, Quantic, Salif Keita, Gerardo Frisina, Baaba Maal, Jazztronik, Zero 7, Afro Celt Sound System, Joe Bataan, Common, The Orb, Eric B & Rakim and many more.

Boogaloo Destroyers 
In 2011, Lugo formed the group Ray Lugo & The Boogaloo Destroyers, centering their sound around 1960s golden-era Boogaloo, a style that was a precursor to salsa in New York City. The band's first album,  Mi Watusi, was well received by fans and critics internationally. The second studio album, ¡Que Chevere! saw its release in 2014 and the album proved instrumental in expanding the group's appeal to a new range of fans and critics  internationally, culminating in a Summer 2015 show at New York's Lincoln Center, where the band performed with pianist Richie Ray as well as with Boogaloo pioneer Pete Rodriguez, who performed live for the first time in over 30 years.

Solo 
2012 saw the release of Lugo's first solo album We Walk Around Like This, on which he highlighted his expanding eclectic tastes. The album featured tones and sounds from locations he felt to be of particular importance to the history of groove-based music, such as Bahia, Lagos, Kingston, San Juan, and Harlem. The album provided Lugo the opportunity to embark on a solo world tour  that featured concerts in the U.S., Canada, South America, Europe, Asia, Australia and New Zealand.

In 2016, Lugo provided lead vocals and collaborated with Latin percussionist and bandleader Roberto Roena on Aquarembe by Bosq Y La Candela All-Stars, seeing it released on Fania Records.  Lugo's second solo album, 2017's Now, highlighted a nod towards more electronic tones and his search for new approaches.

In 2017, Lugo collaborated with German Hip-Hop supergroup Fünf Sterne deluxe on a song and video titled "Afrokalle", featured on the band's album, Flash.

In January 2018, Lugo embarked on a solo tour of Asia featuring DJ Sets and live performances in Vietnam, Singapore, Cambodia, Thailand and China.

April 2018 saw the release of "Pegate Pa' Ca", a song by Bosq featuring lead vocals by Ray Lugo. The track was part of Bosq's Love and Resistance album which was released on Ubiquity Records.

Lugo released a new album, entitled Family Remixes, in August 2018. The album, released on blue vinyl via Ammonite Records, comprised remixed interpretations of Lugo's "Now" album by producers from Australia, Serbia, Portugal, England, Italy, Puerto Rico and other countries.

Terrificos 
Working with Cleveland film composer Jake Fader, Lugo formed a new project dubbed "Terrificos" in 2015. The group's sound  centers on intertwining influences from South American genres such as Chicha, Cumbia with dance elements and cinematic soundscapes. The duo's first studio album,  Go South was well embraced.

A vinyl EP, entitled "Kokolo vs.Terricos" and containing remixes of music by both groups was released in November 2018 on American label Peace & Rhythm.

Personal life 

In 2009, Lugo married French Psychotherapist Rachel Jedwab. The couple live with their two children, as well as two older children from Lugo's previous marriage, and split time between the United States and France.

Lugo has held a lifelong interest in the discourses of Buddha, Krishnamurti, Rajneesh and the Tao Te Ching and feels these have helped him become more balanced in life.

In his spare time, Lugo runs a soccer league for children with special needs and follows Spain's La Liga and England's Premier League.

Discography

Studio albums

12" singles | EPs

7" singles

Compilations featuring Ray Lugo Music

References

External links 
 Official Artist Homepage
 Official YouTube

Spanish-language singers of the United States
Afro-beat musical groups
Musicians from New York City
Musical groups established in 2001
American people of Venezuelan descent